Pietro Magri (May 10, 1873 in Vigarano Mainarda – July 24, 1937 in Oropa) was an Italian composer, conductor and organist.

Life 
Magri studied in the seminary of Faenza where he became priest and taught singing from 1889 to 1894.
After a short appointment in Venice as Maestro of the Cappella Marciana in 1898 he moved to Bari. There he founded the magazine Il Ceciliano.
In the next years he moved to Lecce (1910), Molfetta and Vercelli (1912) and finally to Oropa (1919) where he remained until his death in 1937.

Compositions 
Missa S. Francesco di Sales
Missa defunctorum simplex
Missa in homorem B. Virginis Auxilium christianorum
Missa Joseph fili David

Sources 
De Angelis, Alberto: L'Italia musicale d'oggi, dizionario dei musicisti (1918)

External links
 

1873 births
1937 deaths
20th-century Italian composers
20th-century classical composers
20th-century Italian male musicians
Cappella Marciana composers
Cappella Marciana maestri
Cecilian composers
Italian classical composers
Italian male classical composers
Oropa